A Very Young Lady is a 1941 comedy film directed by Harold D. Schuster and starring Jane Withers and Nancy Kelly.

Cast
 Jane Withers as Kitty Russell
 Nancy Kelly as Alice Carter
 John Sutton as Dr. Franklin Meredith
 Janet Beecher as Miss Steele
 Richard Clayton as Tom Brighton
 June Carlson as Madge
 Charles Halton as Oliver Brixton
 Cecil Kellaway as Professor Starkweather
 Marilyn Kinsley as Susie
 JoAnn Ransom as Linda
 Catherine Henderson as Jean
 Lucita Ham as Sarah
 June Horne as Beth

See also
Girls' Dormitory (1936)

References

External links
 

1941 films
1941 comedy films
American comedy films
Remakes of American films
American films based on plays
Films directed by Harold D. Schuster
20th Century Fox films
American black-and-white films
1940s American films